KTLD-CD, virtual channel 8 (UHF digital channel 15), is a low-powered, Class A 3ABN-affiliated television station licensed to Bakersfield, California, United States. Founded November 18, 1994 by Three Angels Broadcasting Network, it was sold to HC2 Holdings in 2017.

History
A construction permit was granted on September 28, 1998. The station has used the call signs of K08MM and K09WI, and then moved to K08MM-D in 2015. On January 24, 2020, it changed its call sign to KTLD-CD.

Digital channels
The station's digital signal is multiplexed:

References

External links
3ABN Official site

Religious television stations in the United States
Innovate Corp.
TLD-CD
Television channels and stations established in 1998
1998 establishments in California
Low-power television stations in the United States